The painted treeshrew (Tupaia picta) is a treeshrew species of the family Tupaiidae.

The first specimen was described by Oldfield Thomas and was part of a zoological collection from northern Borneo obtained by the British Museum of Natural History.

Characteristics 
The painted treeshrew has a body length of a little bit over 7 inches (18.5 centimeters) and a slightly shorter tail length, making it one of the smaller treeshrews in its genus. Most of its body is a rather dull color compared to other related species, consisting of mostly grayish olive, with a few yellow spots. However, its chin and chest are brighter colored, consisting of mostly orange and yellow. It also has a black stripe on its back.

Distribution and habitat 
The painted treeshrew is endemic to Borneo and inhabits the forests of Brunei, Kalimantan, and Sarawak. It usually lives at lower elevations, below 300 meters, but some specimens have been found at elevations hundreds of meters higher. Although the painted treeshrew is not a threatened species, it still suffers from loss of habitat.

Behaviour and ecology 
The painted treeshrew's diet consists mainly of fruits and insects.

References

Treeshrews
Mammals of Brunei
Mammals of Indonesia
Mammals of Malaysia
Mammals of Borneo
Endemic fauna of Borneo
Mammals described in 1892
Taxa named by Oldfield Thomas
Taxonomy articles created by Polbot